Phùng Văn Nhiên (born 23 November 1982) is a Vietnamese retired footballer who played as a defender.

He began his career with Nam Dinh. He then spent most of his career with mixed successes at Hoang Anh Gia Lai and Hai Phong.

External links 

1982 births
Living people
People from Nam Định
Vietnamese footballers
Vietnam international footballers
V.League 1 players
Hoang Anh Gia Lai FC players
Haiphong FC players
Association football defenders